Sons of Butcher may refer to:
 Sons of Butcher (band), a Canadian rock band consisting of three members.
 Sons of Butcher (album), their self-titled debut album.
 Sons of Butcher (TV show), a cartoon based on the band starring their alter egos.